Little Orton is a hamlet in the English county of Cumbria.

Little Orton is due west of the city of Carlisle and forms part of the civil parish of Orton. Orton Moss lies between Little Orton and Great Orton to its west.

See also

Listed buildings in Orton, Carlisle

Hamlets in Cumbria
City of Carlisle